Frangula is a genus of about 35 species of flowering shrubs or small trees, commonly known as alder buckthorn in the buckthorn family Rhamnaceae. The common name buckthorn is also used to describe species of the genus Rhamnus in the same family and also sea-buckthorn, Hippophae rhamnoides in the Elaeagnaceae.

Description
Frangula is a genus of deciduous shrubs with alternate, simple leaves with stipules, buds without bud scales, branches without spines and flowers with five petals and undivided styles. The fruits are 2 to 4-seeded berries.

Selected species include:
Frangula alnus – alder buckthorn, glossy buckthorn, breaking buckthorn, black dogwood
Frangula azorica
Frangula betulifolia – birchleaf buckthorn
Frangula californica – California buckthorn, coffeeberry
Frangula caroliniana – Carolina buckthorn, Indian cherry (synonym Rhamnus caroliniana)
Frangula purshiana – cascara buckthorn (synonym Rhamnus purshiana)
Frangula rubra – red buckthorn

The European species, alder buckthorn (Frangula alnus) was of major military importance in the 15th to 19th centuries, as its wood provided the best quality charcoal for gunpowder manufacture.

References

 
Rhamnaceae genera
Taxa named by Philip Miller